Richard Friederich Arens (24 April 1919 – 3 May 2000) was an American mathematician. He was born in Iserlohn, Germany. He emigrated to the United States in 1925.

Arens received his Ph.D. in 1945 from Harvard University. He was several times was a visiting scholar at the Institute for Advanced Study (1945–46, 1946–47, and 1953–54). He was an Invited Speaker at the ICM in 1950 in Cambridge, Massachusetts.

Arens worked in functional analysis, and was a professor at UCLA for more than 40 years. He served on the editorial board of the Pacific Journal of Mathematics for 14 years 1965–1979. There are three topological spaces named for Arens in the book Counterexamples in Topology, including Arens–Fort space.

Arens died in Los Angeles, California.

See also
 Arens square
 Mackey–Arens theorem

References

External links
 Richard Friederich Arens at the Mathematics Genealogy Project
 Obituary (PDF) from the Pacific Journal of Mathematics

20th-century American mathematicians
Mathematical analysts
Harvard University alumni
Institute for Advanced Study visiting scholars
Functional analysts
1919 births
2000 deaths
German emigrants to the United States
20th-century German mathematicians
People from Iserlohn
Putnam Fellows